Josephine Meckseper (born 1964) is a German artist, active mainly in New York City. Her large-scale installations and films have been exhibited in various international biennials and museum shows worldwide.

Life and education

Meckseper studied at Berlin University of the Arts in Germany from 1986–1990, and completed her MFA at the California Institute of the Arts in 1992, where she was influenced by artists Michael Asher and Charles Gaines, filmmaker Thom Andersen and literary critic and cultural theorist Sylvère Lotringer.

Work 

Between 1994 and 2000, she was editor of four issues of FAT magazine. Her questions as a conceptual artist include power politics and political ideas as commodities. In 2007 she spoke in Der Spiegel about the position of women in the art scene.

In 2012, her public art project Manhattan Oil Project, commissioned by the Art Production Fund, was installed on the corner of 46th Street and 8th Avenue in New York City. In 2022, she received a Guggenheim Foundation Fellowship.

References 

1964 births
German installation artists
Living people
Berlin University of the Arts alumni
German photojournalists
German contemporary artists
German conceptual artists
20th-century German women artists
21st-century German women artists
Artists from New York City
California Institute of the Arts alumni
20th-century German artists
21st-century German artists
Women installation artists
German women photographers
Women conceptual artists
People from Osterholz
Photographers from Lower Saxony
20th-century women photographers
21st-century women photographers
Women photojournalists